Vulcan was a weekly British anthology reprint comic book magazine published by IPC Magazines from 1975 to 1976, with a heavy emphasis on superhero and action-adventure material.

Publishing history
Swiss publisher Gevacur had released reprinted Fleetway material with some success in mainland Europe, and co-operated with IPC for Vulcan, the title being released as Kobra in mainland Europe. The title allowed Fleetway to make use of its back-catalogue of superhero and adventure strips printed in boys' adventure titles during the 1960s and early 1970s. The magazine was printed in Germany. It was compiled by British-based staff in the form of Valiant editor Sid Bicknell and art editor Jan Shepherd.

Much emphasis was placed on the 7p price corresponding with the seven features, and due to the relatively low overheads from the lack of new material Vulcan was potentially profitable with a print run of around 25,000 copies, a number far below what was viable for other IPC weeklies. Format-wise, it was a departure for British comics of the period, being almost the same size as an American comic (Vulcan issues are slightly larger than US standard comic books) and featuring glossy paper, rather than the newspaper format and newsprint used on other British weeklies; as a result the original artwork often had to be resized or otherwise edited. This was not appreciated by many of the material's original artists.

The title was initially printed in Scotland only to test its viability, with the first issue being dated 1 March 1975. After 28 issues, following the 20 September 1975 edition the title was switched to nationwide - and as a result in-progress stories were edited to conclude so the 27 September 1975 edition could begin with jump-on points for readers in England, Wales and Northern Ireland. However, only 29 national issues followed before the title was cancelled, following the 3 April 1976 issue. A Holiday Special was also published, as was a single annual - which again was unusual in format for the British market by being softback rather than hardcover. The annual also included some new text stories.

After cancellation the title was merged with the still-running Valiant, with a select group of stories being concluded in an insert section over the first three editions of the renamed Valiant and Vulcan.

Content
Each issue had seven major features, occasionally rounded out with short humour strips or adverts for other Fleetway comics whenever a gap arose.

Initial line-up
Mytek the Mighty: Mytek was a huge robotic gorilla built by Professor Boyce but stolen by his assistant Doctor Gogra, who takes it on a rampage around the world, pursued by the heroic Dirk Mason. The full-colour strip was originally printed in Valiant, and was created by Tom Tully.
The Spider: the self-proclaimed King of Crooks, a master criminal, commits various heists while pursued by detectives Bob Gilmore and Pete Trask. The Spider later switches to crimefighting, aided by assistants Roy Ordini and 'Prof' Pelham. The black and white strip was originally printed in Lion, and created by George Cowan and Reg Bunn.
Saber, King of the Jungle: born in the jungles of Africa, white man Saber and his Zulu friend Umbala defend the jungle from poachers and other sinister outsiders. The black and white strip was originally printed in Tiger, and was created by George Cowan.
The Rise and Fall of the Trigan Empire: a science-fantasy epic blending an alien culture with futuristic technology with the appearance of classical Earth culture. The full-colour strip had debuted in Ranger before being moved to Look and Learn, where new instalments were still being printed. The Vulcan reprints started from the beginning of the saga, which was created by Mike Butterworth and Don Lawrence, and occupied the 8 central pages of the magazine.
The Steel Claw: laboratory assistant Louis Crandell develops the ability to turn invisible after an accident, except for his artificial metal hand. Like the Spider, the character started off as a villain before becoming a hero. The black and white strip was originally printed in Valiant, and was created by Tom Tully.
Kelly's Eye: on a trip to South America, Tim Kelly is gifted the Eye of Zoltec, a jewel that makes him invulnerable when hung around his neck. The black and white strip was originally printed in Knockout before switching to Valiant, and was created by Tom Tully.
Robot Archie: a robot built by Professor Ritchie who accompanies the Professor's nephew Ted and his friend Ken Dale on various adventures, including travelling through time in a machine shaped like a time machine shaped like a giant chess rook. While Robot Archie was originally devised for Lion by George Cowan and Ted Kearon and printed in black and white, the Vulcan version used full-colour versions, redrawn by artist Bert Bus for the Dutch comic Sjors and translated back into English.

Later additions
The House of Dolmann: inventor Eric Dolmann and his troop of robot 'puppets' travel around the country stopping criminals. Due to the original strips being self-contained four-page self-contained stories rather than serialised work, the strip was called in whenever a gap opened up in the schedule. The black and white strip was originally printed in Valiant, and was created by Tom Tully.
Billy's Boots: a football-themed strip about schoolboy Billy Dane, who inherited a pair of football boots that once belonged to long-dead England legend "Dead-Shot" Keen. It replaced Saber, King of the Jungle in the final couple of issues before Vulcan'''s cancellation. The strip had originated in Scorcher, and new material was still appearing in Tiger at the time.Raven on the Wing: another football strip, focusing on the adventures of talented Romani footballer Raven, which made a one-off appearance. The colour strip had originally been created by Tom Tully for Valiant''.

References

1975 comics debuts
1975 establishments in the United Kingdom
1976 disestablishments in the United Kingdom
Adventure comics
Comics magazines published in the United Kingdom
Defunct British comics
Defunct magazines published in the United Kingdom
Fleetway and IPC Comics titles
Magazines established in 1975
Magazines disestablished in 1976
Magazines about comics
Science fiction comics
Superhero comics